Bali Mumba (born 8 October 2001) is an English professional footballer who plays as a full-back for League One club Plymouth Argyle on loan from Norwich City.

Club career

Sunderland
Mumba made his senior debut for Sunderland against Wolverhampton Wanderers on the last day of the 2017–18 EFL Championship season, coming on as an 87th-minute substitute for captain John O'Shea, who handed him the captain's armband as he entered the field of play, making him the club's youngest ever captain for the few minutes of play remaining. On 2 November 2018, Mumba signed his first professional contract with the club until 2021. He joined South Shields on loan in March 2020, scoring in his second game, at home to FC United of Manchester.

Norwich City
In July 2020, Mumba joined Norwich City on a four-year deal. On 21st August 2021, he made his Premier League debut in a 5–0 defeat against Manchester City.

On 6 January 2022, Mumba joined EFL Championship side Peterborough United on loan for the remainder of the 2021–22 season. He scored the winner on his debut in a 2–1 win against Bristol Rovers in the FA Cup third round.

On 14 July 2022, Mumba joined EFL League One club Plymouth Argyle on loan for the 2022–23 season. An impressive start to life at Home Park saw Plymouth sitting top of the league with Mumba winning the EFL Young Player of the Month award for September 2022.

International career
Mumba has represented England at under-16, under-17, under-18 and under-19 level. His parents are Congolese.

Career statistics

Honours 
Norwich City
 EFL Championship: 2020–21

Individual
EFL Young Player of the Month: September 2022

References 

2001 births
Living people
Footballers from South Shields
Black British sportspeople
English footballers
England youth international footballers
English sportspeople of Democratic Republic of the Congo descent
Association football midfielders
Hebburn Town F.C. players
Sunderland A.F.C. players
South Shields F.C. (1974) players
Norwich City F.C. players
Peterborough United F.C. players
Plymouth Argyle F.C. players
English Football League players
Northern Premier League players
Premier League players